Tate McDermott (born 18 September 1998) is an Australian rugby union player who plays for the Australian national rugby union team internationally and the  in the Super Rugby competition.  His position of choice is scrum-half.

In 2017, McDermott made his Australian Men's Seven debut at the Wellington Sevens. He also debuted in 2017 in the NRC Championship for Queensland Country. In round 2 of the 2018 Super Rugby season, McDermott made his debut off the bench for the Queensland Reds. McDermott has since had a stellar 2020 campaign with the Queensland Reds in Super Rugby AU starting all nine matches played and scoring 10 points.

McDermott used to surf competitively but quit to focus on rugby when his childhood friend drowned at the Australian Surf Lifesaving Championships on the Gold Coast.

Professional career 
In Late 2020, McDermott was called up to the Wallabies as scrum-half under Dave Rennie, which was an extended 44-man squad. He was rewarded due to an excellent season with the Reds. He made his debut against the New Zealand national rugby union team in a record 43–5 loss. He played all games in the 2021 France rugby union tour of Australia, starting in one game and coming off the bench for the rest, and scoring his maiden try in the deciding test, won 33-30 and confirming the Trophee des Bicentenaries would remain with Australia. McDermott also appeared in the 2021 Bledisloe Cup series, where the Wallabies lost both games at Eden Park in Auckland.

McDermott played a pivotal role in the Wallabies' wins against the Springboks and the Pumas, but was replaced by fellow halfback Nic White in a test against Argentina, forcing him to be benched, and dropped all-together in the final test against Los Pumas, being replaced by Jake Gordon.

References

External links 
 Tate McDermott at Wallabies
 Tate McDermott at ItsRugby.co.uk
 Tate McDermott at ESPNscrum

Australian rugby union players
Australia international rugby union players
1998 births
Living people
Rugby union scrum-halves
Queensland Country (NRC team) players
Queensland Reds players
Rugby union players from Queensland